Michela Massimi is an Italian and British philosopher of science, a professor of philosophy at the University of Edinburgh, and the president-elect of the Philosophy of Science Association. Her research has involved scientific perspectivism and perspectival realism, the Pauli exclusion principle, and the work of Immanuel Kant.

Education and career
Massimi has dual Italian and British citizenship. After studying philosophy at Sapienza University of Rome from 1993 to 1997, she completed a Ph.D. in 2002 at the London School of Economics, and after three years of postdoctoral research as a Junior Research Fellow at Girton College, Cambridge, she became a Lecturer in history and philosophy of science at University College London in 2005. She moved to the University of Edinburgh in 2012 and became professor there in 2015.

She was co-editor-in-chief of the British Journal for the Philosophy of Science from 2011 to 2016, and has been elected as president of the Philosophy of Science Association for the 2023–2024 term.

Recognition
Massimi was the Wilkins–Bernal–Medawar Medalist and Lecturer of the Royal Society in 2017, speaking on "Why philosophy of science matters to science".

She was elected as Fellow of the Royal Society of Edinburgh in 2018, and as Fellow of the Royal Astronomical Society in 2019. She was also elected to the Academia Europaea in 2019.

Books
Massimi is the author of Pauli’s Exclusion Principle: The Origin and Validation of a Scientific Principle (Cambridge University Press, 2005).

Her edited volumes include:
Kant and Philosophy of Science Today (Cambridge University Press, 2008)
Philosophy and the Sciences for Everyone (Routledge, 2014)
Kant and the Laws of Nature (with Angela Breitenbach, Cambridge University Press, 2017)
Understanding Perspectivism: Scientific Challenges and Methodological Prospects (with Casey D. McCoy, Routledge, 2019)
Knowledge from a Human Point of View (with Ana-Maria Creţu, Springer, 2020)

References

External links
Home page

Living people
British philosophers
British women philosophers
Italian philosophers
Italian women philosophers
Philosophers of science
Sapienza University of Rome alumni
Alumni of the London School of Economics
Academics of University College London
Academics of the University of Edinburgh
Members of Academia Europaea
Year of birth missing (living people)